Sibylle is an oil-on-canvas painting created c. 1870 by the French artist Jean-Baptiste-Camille Corot. It depicts a model holding a red rose. The painting is in the collection of the Metropolitan Museum of Art, in New York.

Description
The painting – better described as a portrait – was painted by Corot circa 1870. The work shares stylistic elements with Portrait of Bindo Altoviti, a portrait that was formerly considered to be a self portrait by Raphael, and the Met's description of Sibylle describes the painting as the "height" of Corot's attempts to replicate Raphael's style.

While the title of the painting implies the subject is a Sibyl, others have disputed this.

The painting was donated to the Metropolitan Museum of Art in 1929 as part of the bequest of Louisine Havemeyer.

References

Paintings in the collection of the Metropolitan Museum of Art
1870s paintings
Paintings by Jean-Baptiste-Camille Corot
Portraits of women